Yamshchikov, feminine: Yamshchikova is a Russian language surname derived from the occupation yamshchik (coachman).

The surname may refer to:

 Olga Yamshchikova, Soviet female World War II ace
 Savva Yamshchikov, Soviet and Russian art historian, restorer, and essayist
  (1872-1959), Russian writer, alias Al. Altayev